Toma is a soft or semi-hard Italian cow's milk cheese, noted for its excellent melting qualities. It is made primarily in the Aosta Valley (it is one of the region's specialties) and Piedmont regions of Northwestern Italy. Toma varies with region and locale of production, and is closely related to the French tomme. 

The Toma Piemontese variety from Piedmont has Protected Designation of Origin status under EU legislation, while the Toma di Gressoney or Tomme de Gressoney (French), produced in the Gressoney Valley, is officially recognized as a Prodotto agroalimentare tradizionale and is included in the Ark of Taste catalogue of heritage foods. 

Toma is not very common in Central and South Italy, with Basilicata as the only main producer. The Toma Lucana is also recognized as a PAT.

It can have a fat content of 45%–52%.

See also
 Tomme
 List of cheeses

References

External links
 Disciplinare di produzione 

Piedmontese cheeses
Italian cheeses
Cow's-milk cheeses
Italian products with protected designation of origin
Cuisine of Aosta Valley
Cheeses with designation of origin protected in the European Union